The Deanery of Prostějov (latin: Decanatus Prostannensis) lies in the Archdiocese of Olomouc, Czech Republic. There were reported to be 31,000 members of Catholic Church within the deanery. The deanery has 8 diocesan and 14 religious (MIC, SDB, SDS) priests and covers 34 parishes with 93 churches and chapels.

Deans 

 – 2016 R. D. Miroslav Hřib 
 2016 – R. D. Aleš Vrzala

Parishes

Gallery

Notes

References 
 Archdiocese of Olomouc

External links 
  

Roman Catholic Archdiocese of Olomouc